The 1914 Ohio Green and White football team represented Ohio University as a member of the Ohio Athletic Conference (OAC) during the 1914 college football season. Led by second-year head coach M. B. Banks, the Green and White compiled an overall record of 4–4 with a mark of 3–3 in conference play.

Schedule

References

Ohio
Ohio Bobcats football seasons
Ohio Green and White football